Shelburne—Yarmouth—Clare was a federal electoral district in the province of Nova Scotia, Canada, that was represented in the House of Commons of Canada from 1935 to 1949 and from 1953 to 1968.

This riding was created in 1933 from parts of Digby and Annapolis and Shelburne—Yarmouth ridings. It consisted of the counties of Shelburne and Yarmouth, and the municipality of Clare in the county of Digby. It was abolished in 1947 when it was redistributed into Digby—Yarmouth and Queens—Shelburne ridings.

It was re-created in 1952 from those two ridings, and was abolished again in 1966 into South Shore and South Western Nova ridings.

Members of Parliament

This riding elected the following Members of Parliament:

Election results

1935–1949

1953–1968

See also 

 List of Canadian federal electoral districts
 Past Canadian electoral districts

External links 
 Riding history for Shelburne—Yarmouth—Clare (1933–1947) from the Library of Parliament
 Riding history for Shelburne—Yarmouth—Clare (1952–1966) from the Library of Parliament

Former federal electoral districts of Nova Scotia